Lamprosema is a genus of moths of the family Crambidae described by Jacob Hübner in 1823.

Species
Lamprosema alicialis Schaus, 1927
Lamprosema alphalis (Viette, 1958)
Lamprosema anaemicalis Hampson, 1918
Lamprosema angulinea (Schaus, 1913)
Lamprosema argyropalis (Hampson, 1908)
Lamprosema atsinana Viette, 1989
Lamprosema aurantia Hampson, 1918
Lamprosema aurantifascialis (Hampson, 1896)
Lamprosema baracoalis Schaus, 1920
Lamprosema biformis (Butler, 1889)
Lamprosema bonitalis Schaus, 1927
Lamprosema brunnealis Schaus, 1920
Lamprosema brunnescens (Dyar, 1914)
Lamprosema canacealis (Walker, 1859)
Lamprosema caradocalis Schaus, 1927
Lamprosema cayugalis Schaus, 1920
Lamprosema chrysanthalis Hampson, 1918
Lamprosema clausalis (Dognin, 1910)
Lamprosema commixta (Butler, 1873)
Lamprosema crocodora (Meyrick, 1934)
Lamprosema cuprealis (Moore, 1877)
Lamprosema cyanealis (Walker, 1859)
Lamprosema didasalis (Walker, 1859)
Lamprosema discalis Warren, 1896
Lamprosema distentalis (Walker, 1866)
Lamprosema distincta (Kaye, 1901)
Lamprosema distinctifascia (Rothschild, 1916)
Lamprosema dorisalis (Walker, 1859)
Lamprosema esperanzalis (Schaus, 1912)
Lamprosema excurvalis (Hampson, 1912)
Lamprosema flaviterminalis Hampson, 1918
Lamprosema flavizonalis Hampson, 1918
Lamprosema foviferalis (Hampson, 1912)
Lamprosema fusalis Warren, 1896
Lamprosema fuscifimbrialis (Hampson, 1896)
Lamprosema guttalis (Viette, 1958)
Lamprosema haesitans (Meyrick, 1934)
Lamprosema hebitare Whalley, 1962
Lamprosema hoenei Caradja, 1932
Lamprosema infuscalis (Hampson, 1904)
Lamprosema inglorialis Hampson, 1918
Lamprosema insulicola (T. B. Fletcher, 1922)
Lamprosema kingdoni (Butler, 1879)
Lamprosema ladonalis (Walker, 1859)
Lamprosema lateritialis Hampson, 1918
Lamprosema latinigralis (Hampson, 1899)
Lamprosema leucopis Hampson, 1918
Lamprosema lucillalis (Viette, 1958)
Lamprosema lunulalis Hübner, 1823
Lamprosema malticalis Schaus, 1920
Lamprosema marionalis (Walker, 1859)
Lamprosema memoralis Schaus, 1940
Lamprosema moccalis Schaus, 1920
Lamprosema nannalis (Dyar, 1914)
Lamprosema nigricostalis (Hampson, 1908)
Lamprosema niphealis (Walker, 1859)
Lamprosema niphosemalis Hampson, 1918
Lamprosema noctalis Schaus, 1920
Lamprosema nomangara (Viette, 1981)
Lamprosema ochrimarginalis (Marion, 1954)
Lamprosema oeaxalis (Walker, 1859)
Lamprosema oediproctalis Hampson, 1918
Lamprosema oxiperalis (Hampson, 1912)
Lamprosema pectinalis Hampson, 1918
Lamprosema pelealis (Walker, 1859)
Lamprosema phaleasalis (Walker, 1859)
Lamprosema platyproctalis Hampson, 1918
Lamprosema pogonotornalis Hampson, 1918
Lamprosema polysemalis (Hampson, 1897)
Lamprosema pulveralis (Marion, 1954)
Lamprosema rakotalis (Viette, 1958)
Lamprosema rubricetalis (Snellen, 1880)
Lamprosema salomonalis (T. B. Fletcher, 1910)
Lamprosema santialis Schaus, 1920
Lamprosema semicostalis (Hampson, 1899)
Lamprosema sibirialis (Millière, 1879)
Lamprosema silvosalis (Swinhoe, 1906)
Lamprosema sinaloanensis Dyar, 1923
Lamprosema tampiusalis (Walker, 1859)
Lamprosema tienmushanus Caradja & Meyrick, 1935
Lamprosema tumidicostalis (Hampson, 1908)
Lamprosema variospilalis (Dognin, 1908)
Lamprosema victoriae Dyar, 1923

Former species
Lamprosema charesalis (Walker, 1859)
Lamprosema immundalis (South in Leech & South, 1901)

References

 
Spilomelinae
Crambidae genera
Taxa named by Jacob Hübner